The Blessing of the Throats is a sacramental of the Roman Catholic Church, ordinarily celebrated on February 3, the feast day of Saint Blaise of Sebaste (modern Sivas, Turkey). It is also celebrated in some of the Eastern Catholic Churches, and in parishes of the Anglican Communion on the same day as a commemoration.

The Order of the Blessing of Throats on the Feast of Saint Blaise is in the Book of Blessings (de Benedictionibus). However, it is absent in the Latin original of the revised Roman Ritual (1984).

Background

Article 1625 from The Book of Blessings contains a brief historical background of the blessing of throats:

Details regarding the miraculous healing of the boy vary. One account relates that the miracle occurred during the journey to take Blaise to prison when he placed his hand on the boy's head and prayed; another that the miracle happened while Blaise was in prison when he picked up two candles provided to him and formed a cross around the boy's throat.

The use of candles for the blessing of throats stems from the candles that Blaise used while in prison. When an old woman's pig had been miraculously rescued from a wolf by Saint Blaise, she would visit him in prison, bringing him food and candles to bring him light in his dark cell.

Ritual

In the modern Roman Rite 
Articles 1626 and 1627 explain when and how the blessing takes place:

The candles may be joined together by a red ribbon, the color of martyrdom. Although it is the general custom to touch the throat with the candles, it is not required, especially if the candles are lit. The candles may be held over the person.

If all cannot be blessed individually, the celebrant, without candles, extends his hands over the assembly and says the prayer of blessing.

The following blessing is said:
 
The priest or deacon makes the sign of the cross over the recipient as the blessing is said. If necessary, laypersons are permitted to give the blessing of the throats, but are instructed not to make the sign of the cross.

In the Anglican and Episcopal Churches 
The ordinary Anglican (Episcopal) version of this prayer is:

In the older Roman Rite 
Old editions of the Rituale Romanum gave the following formula for blessing the candles independently of the February 2 Candlemas blessing:

After which, the blessing is made by the ordained minister in these words:

Then, he makes the sign of the cross over the persons head:

Variations and customs

In Germany and in other places, the blessing of throats is given with lighted candles. It is frequently also given on the evening of Candlemas (the previous day), sometimes even on the proximate Sunday, when more people attend Mass than on St. Blaise's proper feast day.

In the Church of San Carlo ai Catinari in Rome, which is dedicated to St. Blaise as co-patron, the blessing is given with a relic of Saint Blaise, in a crystal placed on a large ring, pressed against the throat.

In certain Hispanic countries (e.g., Spain and Mexico), a ribbon is given to be worn around the neck for the nine days following the blessing.

In the Armenian Catholic Church, the neck is anointed with oil on a cotton swab or on a candle. The blessing of throats does not appear to be practiced in the Armenian Apostolic Church.

A Ukrainian Greek Catholic ritual of the blessing of the throats also exists.

Meanwhile, the older Rituale Romanum provides a blessing for bread, wine, water and fruit for the relief of throat ailments on the feast of Saint Blaise.

References

External links

Catholic Encyclopedia: St. Blaise
Video of the Soorp Badarak with blessing of throats at the Armenian Catholic Church of San Biagio della Pagnotta in Rome

Christian worship and liturgy
Health observances
Sacramentals